The Mosler Safe Company was an American multinational manufacturer of security equipment specializing in safes and bank vaults. In 2001, the company was acquired by Diebold Inc. after going bankrupt.

History 
In 1867, Gustave Mosler and Fred Bahmann founded Mosler, Bahmann & Company in Cincinnati, Ohio. In 1874, after Gustave's death, the Mosler family had a falling out with Bahmann. The family left Mosler, Bahmann & Company to start the Mosler Safe & Lock Company. Both companies remained in Cincinnati until the 1890s. When Mosler Safe & Lock Co. outgrew its original factory in 1891, it relocated to Hamilton, where it remained until its bankruptcy. Mosler, Bahmann & Company remained in business until around 1898.

Mosler was controlled by its founding family until 1967, when they sold it to American Standard Companies. American Standard then sold the division to a group of Mosler managers and outside investors in 1986.

After 134 years in business, Mosler filed Chapter 11 bankruptcy in August 2001, citing continuing debt problems, and ceased operations shortly thereafter. Diebold subsequently announced programs to support former Mosler customers and bought most of the original company in bankruptcy court a few months later.

Products 
Mosler's safes and vaults were renowned for their strength and precise manufacturing. Several Mosler vaults installed in Hiroshima's Mitsui Bank building prior to WWII survived the nuclear attack, a fact the company widely publicized in its marketing. 

When the U.S. government began building bunkers and silos during the Cold War, Mosler became the contractor for blast doors. One of them, installed at the Atomic Energy Commission's Oak Ridge National Laboratory, weighed approximately 138 tons including the frame. Mosler built the vault formerly used to display and store the United States Constitution and Declaration of Independence. Mosler also built the gold vaults for the United States Bullion Depository at Fort Knox. Despite the weight, each 58-ton blade could be opened and closed manually by one person.

References

Manufacturing companies established in 1867
Manufacturing companies disestablished in 2001
Security companies of the United States
Security equipment manufacturers
Defunct companies based in Cincinnati
Companies that filed for Chapter 11 bankruptcy in 2001
1867 establishments in Ohio
2001 disestablishments in Ohio
Defunct manufacturing companies based in Ohio